Marco Bergamini (born 12 March 1988) is an Italian footballer, who plays as a defender for Seconda Divisione club Renate, on loan from Milan.

External links
 Profile at Assocalciatori.it 
 
 International caps at FIGC.it 

1988 births
Living people
Italian footballers
Association football defenders
A.C. Milan players
A.S.D. Victor San Marino players
U.S.D. Olginatese players